School segregation in the United States is the separation of students based on their ethnicity. More than half of all students in the United States attend school districts with high concentrations (over 75% either white or nonwhite students) and about 40% of black students attend schools where 90%-100% of students are non-white. 

Segregation in schools has a long history in the United States and American schools are more racially segregated now than in the late 1960s, when segregation laws were finally dismantled. Segregation continued longstanding exclusionary policies in much of the South (where many African Americans lived) after the Civil War, and segregation was codified with Jim Crow laws. These laws were influenced by the history of slavery and discrimination in the US. Secondary schools for African Americans in the South were called training schools instead of high schools in order to appease racist whites and focused on vocational education.  After the ruling of Brown v. Board of Education, which banned segregated school laws, school segregation took de facto form. School segregation declined rapidly during the late 1960s and early 1970s as the government became strict on schools' plans to combat segregation more effectively as a result of Green v. County School Board of New Kent County. However, voluntary segregation appears to have increased since 1990 based on decreases in the amount of interactions between black and white students, also known as the black-white exposure index, and the resegregation of blacks in public schools. Residential segregation in the United States and school choice, both historically and currently, have had a considerable effect on school segregation. Not only does the current segregation of neighborhoods and schools in the US affect social issues and practices, but it is considered by some to be a factor in the achievement gap between Black and white students. Some authors such as Jerry Roziek and Ta-Nehisi Coates highlight the importance of tackling the root concept of racism instead of desegregation efforts that arise as a result of the end of de jure segregation. Along with educational and social outcomes, the average income and occupational aspirations of minority households that are products of segregated schooling have worse outcomes than the products of desegregated schooling.

Native American children faced separation from their families and forced assimilation programs at boarding schools. But there were also cases where Native Americans successfully challenged school segregation and won access to public schools.

Historical segregation

Antebellum Era 
In 1832, Prudence Crandall admitted an African American girl to her all-white Canterbury Female Boarding School in Canterbury, Connecticut, which was the subject of public backlash and protests. She converted the boarding school to one for only African American girls, but Crandall was jailed for her efforts for violating a Black Law. In 1835, an anti-abolitionist mob attacked and destroyed Noyes Academy, an integrated school in Canaan, New Hampshire founded by abolitionists in New England. In 1849, the Massachusetts Supreme Court ruled that segregated schools were allowed under the Constitution of Massachusetts (Roberts v. City of Boston).

Reconstruction era 

The formal segregation of Black and White people in the United States began long before the passage of Jim Crow laws following the end of the Reconstruction Era in 1877. The United States Supreme Court's Dred Scott v. Sandford decision upheld the denial of citizenship to African Americans and found that descendants of slaves are "so far inferior that they had no rights which the white man was bound to respect."

Following the American Civil War and the ratification of the Thirteenth Amendment which ended slavery throughout the entire United States, the Fourteenth Amendment, guaranteeing "equal protection under the law", was ratified in 1868, and citizenship was extended to African Americans. Congress also passed the Civil Rights Act of 1875, banning racial discrimination in public accommodations. But in 1883, the Supreme Court struck down the Civil Rights Act of 1875, finding that discrimination by individuals or private businesses is constitutional.

Jim Crow Era 
Segregation took de jure form with the passage of Jim Crow laws in the 19th century.  The Reconstruction Era saw efforts at integration in the South, but these laws were also passed by state legislatures in the South and parts of the lower Midwest and Southwest, segregating Black and White people in all aspects of public life, including attendance of public schools. These laws were influenced by the history of slavery and discrimination in the US, and stated that schools should be separated by race and offer equal amenities; however, facilities and services were far from equal.The constitutionality of Jim Crow laws was upheld in the Supreme Court's decision in Plessy v. Ferguson (1896), which ruled that separate facilities for Black and White people were permissible provided that the facilities were of equal quality. The fact that separate facilities for Black people and other minorities were chronically underfunded and of lesser quality was not successfully challenged in court for decades.

New Deal era 
Franklin D. Roosevelt enacted certain housing reforms that focused their benefits on home buying aid to only white Americans. These restrictions in loans further separated black and white neighborhoods, which introduced the long term effects of residential segregation projects on schooling. The boundaries housing projects were intentionally drawn so that black neighborhoods had less access to education and jobs. This depletion of resources led to an increase in average poverty rates which broaden academic achievement gaps.

The establishment of the NAACP Legal Defense and Educational Fund (LDF) in 1939 serves as the foundation of the efforts and funding to challenge school segregation. Charles Hamilton Houston initially ran the LDF, and focused heavily on proving that Black schools were severely unequal to white schools Eventually, the LDF shifted its leadership to Thurgood Marshall, who became the first director of the LDF and was a leader in significant court battles including Brown v. Board of Education.

Civil Rights era 

Plessy v. Ferguson was subsequently overturned in 1954, when the Supreme Court ruling in Brown v. Board of Education ended de jure segregation in the United States. The state of Arkansas would experience some of the first successful school integrations below the Mason-Dixon Line. In the decade following Brown, the South resisted enforcement of the Court's decision. States and school districts did little to reduce segregation, and schools remained almost completely segregated until 1968, after Congressional passage of civil rights legislation. In response to pressures to desegregate in the public school system, some white communities started private segregated schools, but rulings in Green v. Connally (1971) and Runyon v. McCrary (1976) prohibited racial discrimination in private schools and revoked IRS-granted non-profit status of schools in violation. Desegregation efforts reached their peak in the late 1960s and early 1970s, a period in which the South transitioned from complete segregation to being the nation's most integrated region.

Mexican-American segregation during these eras 
While African Americans faced legal segregation in civil society, Mexican Americans often dealt with de facto segregation, meaning no federal laws explicitly barred their access to schools or other public facilities, yet they were still separated from white people. The proponents of Mexican-American segregation were often officials who worked at the state and local school level and often defended the creation and sustaining of separate "Mexican schools". Prior to the 1930s, segregation of Mexican children in schools was a rarity. Following the Great Depression, funding from the New Deal and legislation such as the 1934 Sugar Act enabled the creation of segregated schools for Mexican American children in Wyoming. An example of Mexican-American school segregation is from the city of Oxnard, California. According to the district records, the schools and neighborhoods in Oxnard were segregated based on ethnicity. The number of Latino migrants in Oxnard was climbing, causing overcrowding in the schools, which triggered local officials to “solve” this issue by creating a “school-within-a-school” form of segregation, and eventually by establishing a separate school for Latino students. School segregation occurred due to the residential segregation that was also present in Oxnard. By placing restrictive policies and covenants on properties, officials in Oxnard were able to keep Latino residents in a separate neighborhood from the “American” (or non-Latino residents), which provided a justification for segregating the schools. The segregation of Mexican children occurred throughout much of the U.S. West. During the Depression era in Wyoming, the segregation of Mexican children—whether they were US citizens or not—mirrored Jim Crow laws. Wyoming was not alone. The segregation of Mexicans also took place in Colorado, Montana, Nebraska, and Texas. The Blackwell School in Texas is one of the few remaining formerly de facto segregated Mexican school buildings.

Parents of both African-American and Mexican-American students challenged school segregation in coordination with civil rights organizations such as the NAACP, ACLU, and LULAC. Both groups challenged discriminatory policies through litigation in courts, with varying success, and at times challenging policies. They often had small successes. For instance, the NAACP initially challenged graduate and professional school segregation because they believed that desegregation at this level would result in the least backlash and opposition by whites.

Catholic schools 
Initially, Catholic schools in the South generally followed the pattern of segregation of public schools, sometimes forced to do so by law. However, most Catholic dioceses began moving ahead of public schools to desegregate. In St. Louis, Catholic schools were desegregated in 1947.  In Washington, DC, the Catholic schools were desegregated in 1948. Catholic schools in Tennessee were desegregated in 1954, Atlanta in 1962, and Mississippi in 1965, all ahead of the public school systems.

Protestant schools 
In the late 1950s and early 1960s, when some states (including Alabama, Virginia, and Louisiana) closed their public schools to protest integration, Jerry Falwell Sr. seized the opportunity to open "Christian academies" for white students.

Contemporary Segregation

Studies of segregation since the late 1960s 
From 1968 to 1980, segregation between blacks and whites in schools declined. School integration peaked in the 1980s and then gradually declined over the course of the 1990s. In the 1990s and early 2000s, minority students attended schools with a declining proportion of white students, so that the rate of segregation as measured as isolation resembled that of the 1960s. There is some disagreement about what to make of trends since the 1980s; while some researchers have presented trends as evidence of "resegregation," others argue that changing demographics in school districts, including class and income, are responsible for most of the changes in the racial composition of schools. A 2013 study by Jeremy Fiel found that, "for the most part, compositional changes are to blame for the declining presence of whites in minorities' schools," and that racial balance increased from 1993 to 2010. The study found that minority students became more isolated and less exposed to whites within a school although districts were statistically more integrated. Another 2013 study found that segregation measured as exposure increased over the previous 25 years due to changing demographics. The study did not, however, find an increase in racial balance; rather, racial unevenness remained stable over that time period. Researcher Kori Stroub found that the "racial/ethnic resegregation of public schools observed over the 1990s has given way to a period of modest reintegration," but that segregation between school districts has increased even though within-district segregation is low.  Fiel believes that increasing interdistrict segregation will exacerbate racial isolation.

Reason 
One reason for the resegregation of blacks is the fact that public schools were mandated by law to institute effective plans to desegregate, but these plans were only enforced for five years starting in 1968. After the peak of desegregation in 1980, the pressure of conservatives under Richard Nixon's presidency was instrumental in the ruling of Freeman v. Pitts which allowed for the preservation of school segregation. Today, the increase in inter-district segregation is present because of the ruling of Milliken v. Bradley, which banned desegregation across district lines and allowed for diverse districts to simply contain a few majority minority schools, while most schools remain predominantly white.

Another aspect that supports the reversion back to segregated schools is the concept of white flight which occurs when white families choose to move their children into schools with lower minority populations. White Flight was observable in that white student enrollment was significantly decreasing in districts that had a high level of desegregation, especially in the late 60s/early 70s. Factors such as zoning of schools, housing policies, and school choice are the driving factors in the segregation today which shifts to incorporate not only grouping by race, but also by economic class. A wealthier family becomes more likely to relocate and invest in the educational resources of that school zone because it is more affordable. An extension of this choice becomes classroom specific in desegregated schools by way of implementations of courses at the levels of Advanced Placement, International Baccalaureate, and Honors programs which tend to have a higher white majority. Card and Rothstein provide statistical data that highlights the inverse relationship between standardized test scores and exposure to minority students. In this way, given an integrated school, white students are more likely to enroll in more advanced level courses when this choice serves as a way to become less exposed to minority students than when in an all-white environment. Due to these factors, Rosiek concludes that school choice only increases segregation or has no effect at all.

Sources

Residential segregation 
A principal source of school segregation is the persistence of residential segregation in American society; residence and school assignment are closely linked due to the widespread tradition of locally controlled schools. Residential segregation is related to growing income inequality in the United States.

The deterioration of cities and urban education systems between the 1950-80s is the consequence of several post-war policies like the Home Owners' Loans Corporation, Federal Housing Administration, Interstate Highway Act, discriminative zoning practices, and loss of war-time industrial employment perpetuated ‘white flight’ and suburban sprawl at the expense of poor, marginalized urban residents. Mid-20th century urban divestment and suburban development redirected social services and federal funding to predominantly white residencies. Remaining urban residents witnessed dramatic decreases in quality of living, creating countless barriers to a stable life, including in academic success. Consequently, urban school districts became relatively accurate measures for documenting the increasing educational inequalities among students of color.

A study conducted by Sean Reardon and John Yun found that from 1990 to 2000, residential black/white and Hispanic/white segregation declined by a modest amount in the United States, while public school segregation increased slightly during the same time period. Because the two variables moved in opposite directions, changes in residential patterns were not responsible for changes in school segregation trends. Rather, the study determined that in 1990, schools showed less segregation than neighborhoods, indicating that local policies were helping to ameliorate the effects of residential segregation on school composition. By 2000, however, racial composition of schools had become more closely correlated to neighborhood composition, indicating that public policies no longer redistributed students as evenly as before.

In the 2005 Civil Rights Project conducted at Harvard University, researchers reported that over 80% of high-minority schools—where the student population is over 90% non-white—are high poverty schools as indicated by a large majority qualifying for free and reduced lunch. Additionally, of five million enrolled students in two dozen of the largest central cities, 70% are Black and Latino students in predominantly minority-majority, urban schools.

Another study targets spatial inequalities and student outcomes based on the physical and social presence in specific neighborhoods. Factors like pollution, perceived safety, proximity to other students, and healthy learning environments can all affect academic outcomes of various student groups. In correspondence to high poverty environments, students are likely to face various obstacles that prevent effective learning environments including food and housing insecurity. Likewise, Black, Latino, and Indigenous students experience twice the exposure to poor students than their Asian and white counterparts.

Award-winning CQ Researcher Peter Katel amplifies the argument made by Maya Rockeymoore, CEO of Global Policy Solutions, who addresses the geospatial resegregation of schools as structural barriers for impoverished students in inner-city neighborhoods who are never actually prepared to achieve higher education. Katel also reports that educational experts see high densities of marginalized students as a loss of financial resources that most white families do not experience because they are more likely to have the capability to move schools. Acknowledging the resegregation of school and disproportionate allocation of resources is crucial to addressing how the achievement gap is concentrated in underserved urban communities.

A 2013 study corroborated these findings, showing that the relationship between residential and school segregation became stronger over the decade between 2000 and 2010. In 2000, segregation of blacks in schools was lower than in their neighborhoods; by 2010, the two patterns of segregation were "nearly identical".

Supreme Court rulings 
Although the US Supreme Court's decision in Brown v. Board of Education set desegregation efforts in motion, subsequent rulings have created serious obstacles to continued integration. The court's 1970 ruling in Swann v. Charlotte-Mecklenburg Board of Education furthered desegregation efforts by upholding busing as a constitutional means to achieve integration within a school district, but the ruling had no effect on the increasing level of segregation between school districts. The court's ruling in Milliken v. Bradley in 1974 prohibited interdistrict desegregation by busing.

The 1990 decision in Board of Education of Oklahoma City v. Dowell declared that once schools districts had made a practicable, "good faith" effort to desegregate, they could be declared to have achieved "unitary" status, releasing them from court oversight. The decision allowed schools to end previous desegregation efforts even in cases where a return to segregation was likely.  The court's ruling in Freeman v. Pitts went further, ruling that districts could be released from oversight in "incremental stages", meaning that courts would continue to supervise only those aspects of integration that had not yet been achieved.A 2012 study determined that "half of all districts ever under court-ordered desegregation [had] been released from court oversight, with most of the releases occurring in the last 20 years". The study found that segregation levels in school districts did not rise sharply following court dismissal, but rather increased gradually for the next 10 to 12 years. As compared to districts that had never been placed under court supervision, districts that had achieved unitary status and were released from court-ordered desegregation had a subsequent change in segregation patterns that was 10 times as great. The study concludes that "court-ordered desegregation plans are effective in reducing racial school segregation, but ... their effects fade over time in the absence of continued court oversight."

In a pair of rulings in 2007 (Parents Involved in Community Schools v. Seattle School District No. 1 and Meredith v. Jefferson County Board of Education), the court's decision limited schools' ability to use race as a consideration in school assignment plans. In both cases, the Court struck down school assignment plans designed to ensure that the racial composition of schools roughly reflected the composition of the district as a whole, saying that the plans were not "narrowly tailored" to achieve the stated goal and that race-neutral alternatives had not been given adequate consideration.

School choice 

While greater school choice could potentially increase integration by drawing students from larger and more geographically diverse areas (as opposed to segregated neighborhoods), expanded choice often has the opposite effect.  Studies conducted on the relationship between expanded school choice and school segregation show that when studies compare the racial/ethnic composition of charter schools to local public schools, researchers generally find that charter schools preserve or intensify existing racial and economic segregation, and/or facilitate white flight from public schools. Furthermore, studies that compare individual students' demographic characteristics to the schools they are leaving (public schools) and the schools they are switching to (charter schools) generally demonstrate that students "leave more diverse public schools and enroll in less diverse charter schools".

Private schools constitute a second important type of school choice. A 2002 study found that private schools continued to contribute to the persistence of school segregation in the South over the course of the 1990s. Enrollment of whites in private schools increased sharply in the 1970s, remained unchanged in the 1980s, and increased again over the course of the 1990s. Because the changes over the latter two decades was not substantial, however, researcher Sean Reardon concludes that changes in private school enrollment is not a likely contributor to any changes in schools segregation patterns during that time.

In contrast to charter and private schools, magnet schools generally foster racial integration rather than hinder it.  Such schools were initially presented as an alternative to unpopular busing policies, and included explicit desegregation goals along with provisions for recruiting and providing transportation for diverse populations. Although today's magnet schools are no longer as explicitly oriented towards integration efforts, they continue to be less racially isolated than other forms of school choice.

Societal race theories 
Jerry Roziek analyzes the importance of combatting racism itself to solve the problem of school segregation instead of aspects like school choice, housing patterns, and zoning policies which avoid the root of the problem. Society fails not as a result of insufficient data, which demonstrates the negative educational outcomes, but as a result of the societal pressure of racism that overshadows this data. He introduces Derrick Bell's critical race theory, specifically focusing on the concept of racial realism: to view the U.S. as a place where racism will always reside and believe that the reality of curing racism was a threat to the motives of civil rights. In relation to schooling, the removal of desegregation orders was a result of the view that communities were becoming less racist. However, this removal led to an increase in school segregation.

Another theory that influences school segregation is the anti-blackness theory which paints blackness as external to Western human rights. Michael Dumas relates this theory by acknowledging that the awareness of the theory can help teachers respond to the pervasiveness of the social force of racism by supporting black children everywhere. In Ta-Nehisi Coates's Between the World and Me, he focuses on navigating life in a black body in a world built off of such racial brutality that racism is the single most important driving force in prohibiting movement in society.

Outcomes of segregation

Education 
The level of racial segregation in schools has important implications for the educational outcomes of minority students. Desegregation efforts of the 1970s and 1980s led to substantial academic gains for black students; as integration increased, blacks' educational attainment increased while that of whites remained largely unchanged. Historically, greater access to schools with higher enrollments of white students helped "reduce blacks' high school dropout rate, reduce the black-white test score gap, and improve outcomes for black in areas such as earnings, health, and incarceration."

Nationwide, minority students continue to be concentrated in high-poverty, low-achieving schools, while white students are more likely to attend high-achieving, more affluent schools.  Resources such as funds and high-quality teachers attach unequally to schools according to racial and socioeconomic composition.  Schools with high proportions of minority enrollment are often characterized by "less experienced and less qualified teachers, high levels of teacher turnover, less successful peer groups and inadequate facilities and learning materials."  These schools also tend to have less challenging curricula and fewer offerings of Advanced Placement courses.

Access to resources is not the only factor determining education outcomes; the very racial composition of schools can have an effect independent of the level of other resources. A 2009 study determined that attending school with a high proportion of black students negatively affected black academic achievement, even after controlling for school quality, differences in ability, and family background. The effect of racial composition on white achievement was insignificant. However, a 2006 study found that white students are more inclined to take higher level courses at integrated schools to decrease exposure to minorities while the black-white test score gap still decreases with movement from a segregated city to an integrated city.

The categorization of ‘at-risk’ youth typically defines learning differences as disabilities based on a standardized, non-inclusive curriculum; the label ‘at-risk’ inherently follows students of color and low-income students as a generalized academic failure. National academic standardization also extends to federal policies like the No Child Left Behind Act (NCLB), which implemented high-stakes standardized testing across the country in an attempt to address socio-economic disparities in learning outcomes. Schools that were labelled “failures” and faced sanctions under the NCLB Act were typically high poverty schools in segregated districts. Both the standardization of learning outcomes and the implementation of these policies fail to address the structural barriers that created high poverty, highly segregated schools.

Social well-being 
The research that has been conducted on the effects of school segregation can be divided into studies that observe short-term and long-term outcomes of segregated schooling; these outcomes can be either academic or non-academic in nature.

The mixed findings of research on the effects of integration on Black students has resulted in ambiguous conclusions as to the influence of desegregation plans.  Generally, integration has a small but beneficial impact on short-term outcomes for Black students (i.e. education achievement), and a clearly beneficial impact on longer-term outcomes, such as school attainment (i.e. level of education attained) and earnings. Integrated education is positively related to short-term outcomes such as K–12 school performance, cross-racial friendships, acceptance of cultural differences, and declines in racial fears and prejudice.

Short-term and long-term benefits of integration are found for minority and white students alike. Students who attend integrated schools are more likely to live in diverse neighborhoods as adults than those students who attended more segregated schools. Integrated schools also reduce the maintenance of stereotypes and prevent the formation of prejudices in both majority and minority students.

Economics 
In the long run, integration is associated with higher educational and occupational attainment across all ethnic groups, better intergroup relations, greater likelihood of living and working in an integrated environment, lower likelihood of involvement with the criminal justice system, espousal of democratic values, and greater civic engagement. On the other hand, a 2014 study highlights that as segregated schooling increases, the socioeconomic inequalities based on race increases. Billings, Deming, and Rockoff demonstrate how a certain school district focused on the allocation of funds redistributed to schools with a high volume of minority students. Majority-minority schools present areas with high percentages of property that correspond to fewer resources and lower academic capability.

A 1994 study found support for the theory that interracial contact in elementary or secondary school positively affects long-term outcomes in a way that can overcome perpetual segregation against Black communities.  The study reviewed previous research and determined that, as compared to segregated Black people, desegregated Black people are more likely to set higher occupational aspirations, attend desegregated colleges, have desegregated social and professional networks as adults, gain desegregated employment, and work in white-collar and professional jobs in the private sector. In schools with a relatively high average income per students, students are more likely to perform better because they feel safer.

Urban high schools reported significantly greater drop-out rates than their suburban counterparts. Nationwide, high school drop-out rates are centered in a few hundred public schools that are overwhelmingly impoverished, urban, and non-white. The 2000 Census noted that roughly 50% of high school dropouts are employed and earning 35% less than the average national income while college graduates make 131% of the mean national income with 85% employment.

Public school teachers 
Although integration after Brown v. Board of Education is largely viewed as a positive step toward equality, one considerable consequence was the overwhelming loss of Black teachers. Since this loss, Black teachers have not made a resurgence in schools, resulting in an evident racial incongruence between teachers and a rapidly diversifying student population in the US. D'Amico et al. (2017) stated that Brown v. Board of Education “mandated the integration of the nation’s schoolchildren but said nothing of the teacher labor force, effectively diminishing the demand for Black teachers and thus eliminating these community-supported schools and the teachers who staffed them,” (p. 29). This elimination has perpetuated itself into our current day school system, with statistics showing the number of Black teachers as disproportionate to the student population.

Proposed policies 
Although the Supreme Court's ruling in Parents Involved in Community Schools v. Seattle School District No. 1 limited school districts' ability to take race into account during the school assignment process, the ruling did not prohibit racial considerations altogether. According to the UCLA Civil Rights Project, a school district may consider race when using any of the following strategies: "site selection of new schools; drawing attendance zones with general recognition of the racial demographics of neighborhoods; allocating resources for special programs; recruiting students and faculty in a targeted manner; [and] tracking enrollments, performance, and other statistics by race." Districts may use income-based school assignment policies to try to indirectly achieve racial integration, but in practice such policies are not guaranteed to produce even a modest degree of racial integration.

Other researchers argue that, given restrictive court rulings and the increasingly strong relationship between neighborhood and school segregation, integration efforts should instead focus on reducing racial segregation in neighborhoods.  This could be achieved, in part, by greater enforcement of the Fair Housing Act and/or removal of low-density zoning laws. Policy could also set aside low-income housing in new community developments that have a strong school district based on income.

In the school choice realm, policy can ensure that greater choice facilitates integration by, for instance, adopting "civil rights policies" for charter schools. Such policies could require charter schools to recruit diverse faculty and students, provide transportation to ensure access for poor students, and/or have a racial composition that does not differ greatly from that of the public school population. Expanding the availability of magnet schools—which were initially created with school desegregation efforts and civil rights policies in mind—could also lead to increased integration, especially in those instances when magnet schools can draw students from separate (and segregated) attendance zones and school districts. Alternatively, states could move towards county- or region-level school districting, allowing students to be drawn from larger and more diverse geographic areas.

According to some scholars, school assignment policies should primarily focus on socioeconomic integration rather than racial integration. As Richard D. Kahlenberg writes, "Racial integration is a very important aim, but if one's goal is boosting academic achievement, what really matters is economic integration." Kahlenberg refers to a body of research showing that the low overall socioeconomic status of a school is clearly linked to less learning for students, even after controlling for age, race, and family socioeconomic status. In particular, the socioeconomic composition of a school may lead to lower student achievement through its effect on "school processes", such as academic climate and teachers' expectations of students' ability to learn.  If reforms could equalize these school processes across schools, socioeconomic and racial integration policies might not be necessary to close achievement gaps. Sociologist Amy Stuart Wells, however, argues that the original intent of school desegregation was to improve blacks' access to important social institutions and opportunities, thereby improving their long-run life outcomes. Discussions about ending racial integration policies, though, largely focus on the relationship between integration and short-run outcomes such as test scores.  In Stuart's view, long-term outcomes should be emphasized in order to appreciate the true social importance of integration.

See also

United States
 American Indian boarding schools
 Desegregation
 Education segregation in Indiana
 Education segregation in Mississippi Delta
 Education segregation in Mississippi Red Clay region
 Education segregation in New Jersey
 Education segregation in Wisconsin
 Racial segregation in the United States
 School integration in the United States
 Segregation academy
 The Shame of the Nation
Educational Inequality in the United States

Other countries
 Apartheid in South Africa
 Canadian Indian residential school system
 Native schools in New Zealand

Footnotes

Further reading

External links 
 

 
Education in the United States
History of racial segregation in the United States
African-American segregation in the United States
Mexican-American history
Race and education in the United States